The Kansas City Chiefs are a professional American football team based in Kansas City, Missouri. The Chiefs are a member of the Western Division of the American Football Conference in the National Football League (NFL). Originally named the Dallas Texans, the club was founded by Lamar Hunt in 1960 as a charter member of the American Football League. In 1963, the team moved to Kansas City, Missouri and were renamed the Kansas City Chiefs.

The Chiefs have had 55 different quarterbacks attempt a pass, 38 different starting quarterbacks, and 19 different quarterbacks start at least 10 games. Eleven of the Chiefs starting quarterbacks have led the Chiefs to the playoffs, however, only five have won a playoff game. Patrick Mahomes has been the Chiefs' starting quarterback since 2018. Mahomes has been the full-time starting quarterback since the beginning of the 2018 season, when he broke multiple single season team records and became the first Chiefs player to win MVP. Cotton Davidson was the team's first starting quarterback. He played all 14 games for the Texans in their inaugural 1960 season. Davidson played with the franchise from 1960 to 1962, and was traded in 1963 to the Oakland Raiders. Len Dawson signed with the Chiefs (then known as the Texans) on July 2, 1962 and played for the franchise for 14 seasons. With Dawson as the team's starter, the Texans/Chiefs won three American Football League championships and appeared in two Super Bowl championship games. Dawson was named Most Valuable Player after the Chiefs' victory in Super Bowl IV and retired in 1975 with several franchise records. Three quarterbacks currently in the Pro Football Hall of Fame have started at least one game for Kansas City: Dawson, Joe Montana, and Warren Moon. The most quarterbacks started in one season was five in 1987, however, this was primarily due to the player strike that led to teams using replacement players. The Chiefs have had the same quarterback start every game in a season 15 times. Trent Green started the most consecutive games with 81. Mahomes and Dawson are the only quarterbacks to lead the Chiefs to the Super Bowl, I and IV for Dawson and LIV, LV and LVII for Mahomes, with the Chiefs winning IV, LIV, and LVII.

Starting quarterbacks by season

Regular-season

The number of games started in the season by each player is listed in small parentheses. Statistics do not include postseason starts.

14 game seasons

16 game seasons

17 game seasons

Post-season records

Most games as starting quarterback
Only the top 10 are listed below.

As of week 15 of the 2022 season

Team career passing leaders 
Below are the top five quarterbacks in each category throughout their tenure with the Chiefs. Stats are complete through week 18 of the 2022 NFL Season.
Yards

Touchdowns

Quarterback rating (minimum 500 attempts)

Notes 
: Strikes by the National Football League Players Association in the 1982 and 1987 seasons resulted in shortened seasons (9 and 15-game schedules, respectively).
: Replacement quarterbacks Matt Stevens, Frank Seurer, and Doug Hudson started for the Chiefs alongside Kenney and Blackledge following the NFL Players Association strike in 1987. For the only time in team history, five different quarterbacks started in 1987 following the player's strike.

See also 
History of the Kansas City Chiefs

References 
Kansas City Chiefs Franchise Encyclopedia
Kansas City Chiefs all-time starting quarterbacks

General
 Herb, Patrick, Kuhbander, Brad, Looney, Josh, and Moris, Pete, eds. 2008 Kansas City Chiefs Media Guide, Kansas City Chiefs Football Club, Inc., 2008
Specific

Kansas City Chiefs

quarterbacks